Phil Prendergast (born 20 September 1959) is a former Irish Labour Party politician who served as a Member of the European Parliament (MEP) for the South constituency from 2011 to 2014, Leader of the Labour Party in the Seanad in 2011 and a Senator for the Labour Panel from 2007 to 2011.

Early and private life
Phil Foley was born in County Kilkenny. She was a midwife at South Tipperary General Hospital for more than 20 years, having trained in Waterford Regional Hospital. She is married to Ray Prendergast, a psychiatric nurse, and has two children.

She is a former local branch officer with the Irish Nurses and Midwives Organisation, on the Executive Board of which she served in 1994.

Political career

Local
Prendergast served on Clonmel Borough Council and South Tipperary County Council from 1999 to 2007, where she was elected originally as a member of the Workers and Unemployed Action Group (WUAG).

National
She first contested an election to Dáil Éireann in June 2001, when she stood on behalf of the WUAG in the Tipperary South by-election that followed the death of Theresa Ahearn; she polled 7,897 first preference votes. In June 2005, she left the WUAG to join the Labour Party. She was a Labour candidate at the 2007 general election in the Tipperary South constituency; she was unsuccessful, but was subsequently elected to the Seanad Eireann by the Labour Panel.

She caused some controversy within the local Labour Party branch when she tried to nominate a family member to replace her on the council.

Previously a Labour spokesperson on the Older Person, Prendergast served in the Seanad as a spokesperson on Health, Art and Sports, and Social and Family Affairs. She unsuccessfully contested the 2011 general election in Tipperary South, receiving almost 11.0% of the first preference votes.

European
In April 2011 she was selected as the replacement for MEP Alan Kelly, who was elected to Dáil Éireann at the 2011 election for Tipperary North. She sat on the Committee on the Internal Market and Consumer Protection, and on the Agriculture and Rural Development Committee. As a Member of the European Parliament, Prendergast spoke 127 times in plenary session and worked on the amendation of 32 reports.

She was involved in a controversy with the Labour Party leadership when she became the first member of the parliamentary party to call for the resignation of Health Minister James Reilly, following the announcement of the location of primary care health centres in the minister's own constituency.

She lost her seat at the 2014 European Parliament election.

References

External links

1959 births
Living people
Irish midwives
Irish nurses
Labour Party (Ireland) MEPs
Labour Party (Ireland) senators
Local councillors in South Tipperary
Members of the 23rd Seanad
21st-century women members of Seanad Éireann
MEPs for the Republic of Ireland 2009–2014
21st-century women MEPs for the Republic of Ireland